Would Jesus Wear a Rolex is a song written by Margaret Archer and Chet Atkins, and recorded by Ray Stevens in 1987 on his album Crackin' Up!.  The song reached 41 on the US Hot Country Songs chart and 45 on the Canadian Country chart.

The song tells of Stevens watching a televangelist, soliciting funds while wearing expensive clothing ("Asking me for $20, with $10,000 on his arm").  The remainder of the song consists of Stevens asking various questions in the manner of What Would Jesus Do?; the issues the singer raises parallel scandals surrounding various real-life televangelists of the era.

References

1987 songs
1987 singles
Ray Stevens songs
Songs written by Chet Atkins
Songs about television
Songs about Jesus
Songs critical of religion
Protest songs
MCA Records singles